There are several places in Oxfordshire, England, called Moreton (meaning "habitation on a marsh"):

The two neighbouring villages of North and South Moreton in the old Moreton Hundred.
The hamlet (in previous times a larger village) of Moreton, a mile to the south-west of Northmoor, at coordinates .
The hamlet of Moreton, near Thame.

The town of Moreton-in-Marsh (often referred to as Moreton) lies just over the border in Gloucestershire.

Villages in Oxfordshire